Karyakino is a rural locality (a village) in Muzyakovsky Selsoviet, Krasnokamsky District, Bashkortostan, Russia. The population was 130 as of 2010. There are 6 streets.

Geography 
Karyakino is located 17 km northeast of Nikolo-Beryozovka (the district's administrative centre) by road. Vorobyovo is the nearest rural locality.

References 

Rural localities in Krasnokamsky District